UW Canis Majoris is a star in the constellation Canis Major. It is classified as a Beta Lyrae eclipsing contact binary and given the variable star designation UW Canis Majoris.  Its brightness varies from magnitude +4.84 to +5.33 with a period of 4.39 days. Bode had initially labelled it as Tau2 Canis Majoris, but this designation had been dropped by Gould and subsequent authors.

UW Canis Majoris A is a rare blue supergiant of spectral type O7.5-8 Iab.  The precise characteristics of the system are still uncertain, in part because the spectral signature of the secondary is very hard to disentangle from the spectrum of the primary and the surrounding envelope of stellar wind.  A detailed spectral study by Gies et al. found that the primary had a diameter 13 times that of the Sun, while its secondary companion is a slightly cooler, less evolved and less luminous supergiant of spectral type O9.7Ib that is 10 times the Sun's diameter. According to this study, the brighter star is the more luminous, its luminosity 200,000 times that of the Sun as opposed to the secondary's 63,000 times. However the secondary is the more massive star at 19 Solar masses compared to the primary's .

However, a more recent photometric analysis finds several configurations of mass and luminosity ratios that match the observed data.

Parallax measurements showed it to be approximately 3,000 light years from Earth, but this is unexpectedly close for a star of its spectral type and brightness. It is thought to be a distant member of NGC 2362 which would place it about 5,000 light years and more closely match its expected luminosity. The contradiction between the different distance results is still a subject of research.

References

Beta Lyrae variables
O-type supergiants
Canis Major
Canis Majoris, 29
Canis Majoris, UW
035412
Durchmusterung objects
057060
2781
Emission-line stars